The Autopista del Mediodía is a Cuban motorway linking Havana to San Antonio de los Baños.

Route
The motorway is a dual carriageway with 4 lanes and has some at-grade intersections with rural roads. It starts in Havana, next to an interchange of the A4 motorway, and continues through Artemisa Province; crossing the eastern side of Bauta municipality, and ending in a fork, east of San Antonio de los Baños. After the fork, the provincial road towards south reaches the nearby San Antonio de los Baños Airfield and the town of Güira de Melena (10 km far).

See also

Roads in Cuba
Transport in Cuba
Infrastructure of Cuba

References

External links

Autopista Mediodia
Transport in Havana
Artemisa Province